The Parliamentary Secretary to the Board of Agriculture and Fisheries was a junior ministerial office in the British government, serving under the Minister of Agriculture and Fisheries. The title changed to Parliamentary Secretary to the Ministry of Agriculture and Fisheries in 1919 and to Parliamentary Secretary to the Ministry of Agriculture, Fisheries and Food in 1957.

Parliamentary Secretaries to the Board of Agriculture and Fisheries
1909–1911 Sir Edward Strachey
1911–1914 The Lord Lucas of Crudwell
1914–1915 Sir Harry Verney, 4th Baronet
1915–1916 Sir Francis Dyke Acland, 14th Baronet
1916–1919 Sir Richard Winfrey
1917–1918 The Duke of Marlborough
1918 The Viscount Goschen
1918–1919 The Lord Clinton
1919 Sir Arthur Griffith-Boscawen

Parliamentary Secretaries to the Ministry of Agriculture and Fisheries
1919-1921 Sir Arthur Griffith-Boscawen
1921 Vacant
1921 The Earl of Onslow
1921-1924 The Earl of Ancaster
1924 Walter Robert Smith 
1924-1928 The Lord Bledisloe 
1928-1929 The Earl of Stradbroke 
1929-1930 Christopher Addison 
1930-1931 The Earl De La Warr
1931 Vacant  
1931-1935 The Earl De La Warr
1935-1936 Herwald Ramsbotham 
1936-1939 The Earl of Feversham
1939-1940 The Lord Denham
1940-1941 The Lord Moyne (jointly)
1940-1945 Tom Williams (jointly)
1941-1945 The Duke of Norfolk (jointly) 
1945 Donald Scott (jointly)
1945 The Duke of Norfolk (jointly)
1945-1950 The Earl of Huntingdon (jointly)
1945-1947 Percy Collick (jointly)
1947-1951 George Brown (jointly)
1950-1951 The Earl of Listowel (jointly)
1951 Arthur Champion
1951-1954 The Lord Carrington (jointly)
1951-1957 Richard Nugent (jointly)
1954-1957 The Earl St Aldwyn (jointly)
1955-1957 Harmar Nicholls
1955-1957 Williams Deedes

Parliamentary Secretaries to the Ministry of Agriculture, Fisheries and Food
1957-1958 The Earl St Aldwyn (jointly)
1957-1960 Joseph Godber (jointly)
1958-1962 The Earl Waldegrave (jointly)
1960-1962 William Vane (jointly)
1962-1964 The Lord St Oswald (jointly)
1962-1964 James Scott Hopkins (jointly)
1964-1970 John Mackie (jointly)
1964-1970 James Hutchison Hoy (jointly)
1970-1972 Anthony Stodart
1972 Peter Mills
1972-1974 Peggy Fenner
1974 The Earl Ferrers
1974 Roland Moyle
1974 Edward Stanley Bishop
1974-1979 Gavin Strang

Parliamentary Secretary to the Board of Agriculture and Fisheries
Defunct ministerial offices in the United Kingdom